Nadia Tromp (born 31 January 1977) is a South African architect, known for her work with social and public architecture, particularly healthcare within the context of South Africa. In 2017 she was the world architecture festival winner in the category of health for her Westbury clinic. She later received the 2017 award of excellence from GIFA (Gauteng Institute for Architecture) and the 2018 award of merit from SAIA (South African Institute of Architects). In 2019 her firm won the architecture Masterprize in the category of mixed use.

Early life and education 
Tromp was born in Fishhoek, South Africa. She studied her undergraduate degree at the University of Cape Town, and then her master's degree at Harvard University.  After graduating and working at Noero Wolff architects under Jo Noero, she went on to become a director at Paragon Habitat Architects. In 2008 she founded her firm "Ntsika Architects", meaning pillar of strength or home pillar.

Design approach 
Tromp prioritizes architecture that has social impact. Her work on clinics in South Africa, in collaboration with the government and work in the civic sphere has led to her specialization in the field. Tromp has spoken at the AZA festival in Pretoria and has been a judge for the PPC Imaginarium Award for Architecture.

Union Internationale des Architectes (UIA) 
Tromp holds the position of Director of the International Union of Architects (UIA) "Community Architecture" - Architecture & Human Rights, Work programme, a global ongoing workshop that runs parallel to the preparation for each UIA Congress, this workshop is to be completed in time for the 2020 Brazil UIA Congress.

GIFA (Gauteng Institute for Architecture) 
In February 2018 Tromp was elected President of the Gauteng Institute for Architecture, her term ended in February 2020 when the next president for GIfA, Krynauw Nel was elected.

Selected work

Hillbrow Esselen Street Clinic 
Year: 2014/15

Location: South Africa, Hillbrow

Westbury Clinic 
Year: 2014/15

Location: South Africa, Westbury

Westbury Transformation Development Centre 
Year: 2015/16 - 2019

Location: South Africa, Westbury

Upcoming projects

Rea Vaya BRT Stations & Urban upgrades 
Year: 2019 - 2022

Location: South Africa, Sandton & Gandhi Square

Awards and recognitions 
 2015 - 19millionproject winner – MoHM (Museum of Human Migration) Mobile Modular Museum, Rome
 2015 - Mbokodo South African Women in the Arts
 2017 - Women in Construction Awards – Architecture - finalist 
 2017 - Award of merit for Westbury Clinic Project - GIFA
 2017 - Completed Buildings Category Winner for Westbury Clinic Project - World Architecture Festival, Berlin 
 2018 - SAIA- Corobrik Merit Award: Westbury Clinic Project
 2018 - President of Gauteng Institute for Architects (GIFA)
 2018 - Director of the International Union of Architects (UIA)

"Community Architecture" - Architecture & Human Rights, Work Programme

References

1977 births
Living people
South African women architects
21st-century South African architects
People from Fish Hoek
University of Cape Town alumni
Harvard University alumni